Wattle Downs is a suburb of South Auckland, New Zealand.

The suburb is located in the Wattle farm peninsula of the Manukau Harbour and is in the Manurewa-Papakura ward, one of the thirteen administrative divisions of Auckland Council. 

The closest town centre is Manurewa.

It also includes the area of Wattle Cove and Mahia Park.

Development

History 
Wattle Downs gets its name from the 200-acre blackwood and silver leaf wattle grove planted on the peninsula in 1884 by farmer Mr White for an extract from the bark used in the tanning of skins. The project would subsequently fail due to planting the wrong trees; however, the 'Wattle Downs' name remains.

Under the company name Wattle Downs Ltd, the Kimptons, Campbells, and Clements families purchased the 457-acre dairy farm in 1933 during the Great Depression. The first residential development started around 1970, after developers acquired the farm following the rapid urban sprawl of surrounding suburbs. Dairy farming in the area would eventually come to an end in 2006.

Housing 

The 'Wattledown estate' development takes place in the early 1970s after the Campbell family sold their land to Northfield Mercantile Developments Ltd. 1400 single-detached homes were planned to be built on the southern side of the Wattle farm peninsula. The first houses were put on the market in 1974 featuring predominantly bungalows and a variety of 70's style housing. The streets were named after prominent golf courses internationally as the subdivision was built around the Wattle Downs golf course. The Bluewater Cove subdivision, situated on the peninsula's northern side was built alongside the establishing housing estate with the first houses on the market by 1976.
Mahia Park, a 243-section subdivision, built houses on the peninsula's east side adjacent to Papakura Stream. The houses were built throughout the early 90s-2000s. Before being sold off for development, the original land belonged to Ian Ross and the Ross family.

 Wattle Cove, a development jointly built by Winstone, Fletcher Building and Dempsey Morton, was a $300 million (NZD) subdivision that built 900 houses on the peninsula's west side throughout 2001 - 2016. A primary school and early learning centre was also built. Some roads in this development are also named after well-known golf courses, mainly from the United Kingdom. 
Acacia Cove, a retirement village, was opened in 1993 and currently has 217 villas and 15 self-contained apartments. Wattle Downs Care Home, operated by Bupa, was opened in March 2016 and is a further retirement community situated opposite Acacia Cove. It includes 60 rest homes, a medical and geriatric hospital and Bupa Short Stay services.
 A large greenfield landholding on the western waterfront side of the Wattle Cove precinct currently zoned as Mixed Housing Suburban per the Auckland Unitary Plan remains as privately owned open space held by the Kimpton family following the adjacent development of Wattle Cove.
 Wattle Park, a development that started construction in 2019, is a 112 terraced home subdivision by Signature Homes located off Mahia Road opposite the established peninsula's housing.

Landscaping 

Many of the streets in Wattle Downs are tree-lined, and the majority of the trees are non-native. However, the reserves in the suburb contain a mix of native and foreign trees planted over the course of the 1900s. Several artificial wetlands and detention ponds were built in reserves for stormwater management and creating small habitats for wildlife. The coastline of the Wattle downs peninsula has had erosion control implemented using rock retaining walls after a management plan by the former Manukau City Council was introduced in 1993 to combat seashore erosion in the suburb's coastal reserves.

Historically, Kauri trees were prominent in the area; it was a place where the Te Waiohua tribes collected Kauri resin as it was required to produce the tattoo pigment used in Tā moko (traditional Māori tattoos).

Demographics

Wattle Downs had a population of 8,496 at the 2018 New Zealand census, an increase of 1,038 people (13.9%) since the 2013 census, and an increase of 1,683 people (24.7%) since the 2006 census. There were 2,589 households, comprising 4,095 males and 4,401 females, giving a sex ratio of 0.93 males per female, with 2,004 people (23.6%) aged under 15 years, 1,638 (19.3%) aged 15 to 29, 3,606 (42.4%) aged 30 to 64, and 1,245 (14.7%) aged 65 or older.

Ethnicities were 53.1% European/Pākehā, 25.0% Māori, 22.8% Pacific peoples, 16.6% Asian, and 2.6% other ethnicities. People may identify with more than one ethnicity.

The percentage of people born overseas was 29.7, compared with 27.1% nationally.

Although some people chose not to answer the census's question about religious affiliation, 38.6% had no religion, 43.8% were Christian, 2.8% had Māori religious beliefs, 4.2% were Hindu, 1.4% were Muslim, 0.8% were Buddhist and 2.0% had other religions.

Of those at least 15 years old, 1,161 (17.9%) people had a bachelor's or higher degree, and 1,290 (19.9%) people had no formal qualifications. 1,221 people (18.8%) earned over $70,000 compared to 17.2% nationally. The employment status of those at least 15 was that 3,489 (53.7%) people were employed full-time, 657 (10.1%) were part-time, and 237 (3.7%) were unemployed.

Education
Clayton Park opened in 1979. Reremoana opened on 7 February 2006. It was built to cater for the rapidly growing population in the local area.

Rolls are as of 

ELCM Wattle Cove is an early learning centre (6 months – 5 years old). It is situated next-door to Reremoana School

Recreation

The Wattle Downs Golf Course is a 9-hole golf course nestled in the middle of the suburb. 
It was opened in 1979 during the early stages of the suburb's development and was co-designed by New Zealand professional golfer Sir Bob Charles.

The Wattle Downs Path is a 7km shared path that follows the waterfront around the peninsula and links numerous reserves in the area. The path includes views over Waimahia Creek and Pahurehure Inlet towards Conifer Grove, Weymouth and Karaka.

Reserves in the area include Wattle Downs Esplanade Reserve, Wattle Farm Ponds Reserve, Tington Wetlands Reserve, and Kauri Point Reserve.

A footbridge across the Papakura Stream linking Wattle Downs to the newly established suburb of Waiata Shores has been proposed.

There are 4 playgrounds scattered around the suburb.

Wattle Farm Ponds Reserve 
The ponds at Wattle Farm Ponds Reserve were established in the 1960s. They were previously sewage treatment ponds serving the Manurewa district before being decommissioned in 1967 after the completion of the Mangere Treatment Plant. The reserve now pumps sewage through its large wastewater pumping station, commissioned in 2012, and pumps most sewage from Manurewa into the Mangere Treatment Plant. 

After the sewage ponds were decommissioned, the Manukau City Council acquired the land to be developed as Wattle Farm Reserve. The two ponds now act as a freshwater cleansing system to take the silt from the runoff of the Papakura and Waimahia streams before it flows into the Manukau Harbour. The main pond is between 0.6m deep at the jetty end, to 1.6m at the far end by the tide gate. A $3.5 million improvement project of the reserve commenced throughout 2017-2018, and improved water quality and sediment management, new recreational facilities were also built. The ponds are used for radio-controlled boating, model yachting, and waka ama racing.

References

Suburbs of Auckland
Populated places around the Manukau Harbour